The white savior is a cinematic trope in which a white central character rescues non-white (often less prominent) characters from unfortunate circumstances. This recurs in an array of genres in American cinema, wherein a white protagonist is portrayed as a messianic figure who often gains some insight or introspection in the course of rescuing non-white characters (or occasionally non-human alien races that substitute as non-white civilizations) from their plight.

The narrative trope of the white savior is one way the mass communications medium of cinema represents the sociology of race and ethnic relations, by presenting abstract concepts such as morality as characteristics innate, racially and culturally, to white people, not to be found in non-white people. This white savior is often portrayed as a man who is out of place within his own society, until he assumes the burden of racial leadership to rescue non-white minorities and foreigners from their suffering. As such, white savior stories have been described as "essentially grandiose, exhibitionistic, and narcissistic" fantasies of psychological compensation.

Trope
In "The Whiteness of Oscar Night" (2015), Matthew Hughey describes the narrative structure of the subgenre:

A White Savior film is often based on some supposedly true story. Second, it features a nonwhite group or person who experiences conflict and struggle with others that is particularly dangerous or threatening to their life and livelihood. Third, a White person (the savior) enters the milieu and through their sacrifices, as a teacher, mentor, lawyer, military hero, aspiring writer, or wannabe Native American warrior, is able to physically save—or at least morally redeem—the person or community of folks of color, by the film's end. Examples of this genre include films like Glory (1989), Dangerous Minds (1996), Amistad (1997), Finding Forrester (2000), The Last Samurai (2003), Half Nelson (2006), Freedom Writers (2007), Gran Torino (2008), Avatar (2009), The Blind Side (2009), The Help (2011).

The films of the blaxploitation genre of the 1970s reflected discontent over the social and racial inequality of non-white people in the United States and functioned as counterbalance to the trope of the white savior. According to some scholars, such as Peter Lang, continued cultural hypersegregation in the 1980s led to the common belief, by many American white people, that the nation had reached a post-racial state of social relations, which resulted in a backlash against the racial and ethnic diversity of the cinema of the previous decades, on screen during the 1960s and the 1970s; thus, the popular cinema of the 1990s and the early 2000s featured the white savior narrative. That reappearance of the white-savior narrative occurred because the majority of white people in the United States had little substantive social interaction with people of different races and ethnic groups.

The White Savior trope's prevalence continues in often critically acclaimed films. Joseph Vogel writes of the trope in Django Unchained:In the crucial climactic scene, the pattern of white centrality holds. It is [the white doctor] Schultz, not [the freed slave] Django, who, racked by conscience kills Calvin Candie, and in doing so, sacrifices his own life. When asked by Henry Louis Gates, Jr. why he decided to make King Schultz the Christ figure, Tarantino claimed he was simply drawing on the tropes of the western.A study of 50 films between 1987 and 2011 deemed to be white savior films found that 36% of studied films were produced by the 6 major studios (Sony, Universal, Paramount, Twentieth Century Fox/Fox Searchlight, or Warner Brothers). These films are also responsible for a plurality of the major awards in this time period.

Types of story

Inspirational teacher
The white-savior teacher story, such as Up the Down Staircase (1967), Dangerous Minds (1995), and Freedom Writers (2007), "features a group of lower-class, urban, non-whites (generally black and Latino/a) who struggle through the social order in general, or the educational system specifically. Yet, through the sacrifices of a white teacher they are transformed, saved, and redeemed by the film's end." As an inspirational tale of the human spirit, the storyline of the white-savior-teacher is not racist, in itself, but is culturally problematic because it is a variant of the white-savior narrative that factually misrepresents the cultural and societal reality that there exist minority-group teachers who have been successfully educating (racial, ethnic, cultural) minority-group students in their communities, without the saving stewardship of white people.

Welcome Back, Kotter is a 1970s television series about the education system that has been described as having white savior themes.

Man of principle

The white savior's principled opposition to chattel slavery and to Jim Crow laws makes him advocate for the humanity of slaves and defender of the rights of black people unable to independently stand within an institutionally racist society, in films such as To Kill a Mockingbird (1962), Conrack (1974), and Amistad (1997). Despite being stories about the racist oppression of black people, the white-savior narrative relegates non-white characters to the story's background, as the passive object(s) of the dramatic action. In the foreground it places the white man who militates to save the non-white characters from the depredations of racist white folk. Respectively, aspects can include: a false accusation of inter-racial rape, truncated schooling, and chattel slavery.

List of associated films

See also

 Magical Negro
 List of Magical Negro occurrences in fiction
 Noble savage
 "The White Man's Burden"
 Whitewashing in film

References

Bibliography

Further reading

 
History of racism in the cinema of the United States
Lists of films by common content
Sociology of culture
Stock characters
Works about white people
Stereotypes of white people
Race-related controversies in film
Tropes